Gran Peña Fútbol Club is a Spanish football club based in the parish of Lavadores, Vigo, in the autonomous community of Galicia. Founded in 1926 it currently plays in Tercera Federación, holding home games at Municipal de Barreiro, with a 4,500-seat capacity.

In 2021 the club signed an agreement with Celta de Vigo, turning Gran Peña into Celta's 2nd reserve team, under the name Celta C - Gran Peña.

Club background
Club Gran Peña (1926–71)
Club Gran Peña Celtista (1971–88)
Gran Peña Fútbol Club (1988–2021)
Celta C - Gran Peña (2021-)

Season to season

39 seasons in Tercera División

Famous players
 Javier Falagán
 Nacho (youth)
 Borja Oubiña (youth)
 Roberto Lago (youth)

References

External links
Official website 

Football clubs in Galicia (Spain)
Association football clubs established in 1926
Divisiones Regionales de Fútbol clubs
1926 establishments in Spain